Heniocha is a genus of moths in the family Saturniidae first described by Jacob Hübner in 1819.

Species
Heniocha apollonia (Cramer, 1782)
Heniocha digennaroi Bouyer, 2008
Heniocha distincta Bryk, 1939
Heniocha dyops (Maassen, 1872)
Heniocha hassoni Bouyer, 2008
Heniocha marnois (Rogenhofer, 1891)
Heniocha pudorosa Darge, 2005
Heniocha vingerhoedti Bouyer, 1992
Heniocha werneri Bouyer, 2001

References

Saturniinae